Quatiara luctuosa is a species of beetle in the family Cerambycidae, and the only species in the genus Quatiara. It was described by Leséleuc in 1844.

References

Hemilophini
Beetles described in 1844